Ozbekuy-e Jadid (also Romanized as Ozbekūy-e Jadīd; also known as Osbak Kūh, Ozbagū, Ozbagū-ye Jadīd, Ozbak Kūh, Ozbakū-ye Jadīd, and Usbeg Kūh) is a village in Kuh Yakhab Rural District, Dastgerdan District, Tabas County, South Khorasan Province, Iran. At the 2006 census, its population was 96, in 27 families.

References 

Populated places in Tabas County